Taras Bulba, is a 1909 Russian short film directed by Aleksandr Drankov. It is a silent film, based on the novel by Nikolai Gogol.

In 1962, a long film of the same name, based loosely on the Gogol novel, premiered.

Starring 
 Anisim Suslov
 L. Manko
 D. Chernovskaya

References

External links 
 

1909 films
1900s Russian-language films
Russian silent short films
1909 short films
Russian black-and-white films
Films of the Russian Empire